Hercules of the Desert (/ Valley of the Thundering Echo), aka Maciste and the Women of the Valley, is a 1964 Italian peplum film directed  by Tanio Boccia and starring Kirk Morris.

Plot	
A fabulous land of green pastures is protected from invasion by the mysterious Valley of the Thundering Echo. Queen Farida draws together the desert tribes to conquer the land, even though a prophecy has promised the land to the Gameli tribe. The Gameli journey to the Silver Temple, where the High Priest summons the legendary Maciste from the mountain rock to defeat their enemies and guide them to their promised land. Maciste materializes magically from a rock wall in a cave in this film, tying in with Maciste's claim in earlier films that his name means born of the rock.

Cast   
Kirk Morris as  Maciste  
Hélène Chanel as Farida 
 Alberto Farnese as  Masura 
 Špela Rozin as  Selina 
  Furio Meniconi as  Manatha 
 Rosalba Neri as  Ramhis  
 Nando Tamberlani as  Manata the Savvy 
 Dante Posani as  Tarash

References

External links

   
Italian fantasy films
Peplum films 
1960s fantasy films   
Films directed by Tanio Boccia 
Films scored by Carlo Rustichelli
Sword and sandal films
1960s Italian-language films
1960s Italian films